John Lavin may refer to:
 John Lavin (trade unionist)
 John Lavin (artist)
 Johnny Lavin, baseball player